The 18th European Athletics Championships were held from 6 August to 11 August 2002 in the Olympic Stadium of Munich, Germany.

Men's results

Track
1994 |1998 |2002 |2006 |2010 |

1 Dwain Chambers originally won the 100 m in 9.96 and was part of the British team (with Christian Malcolm, Darren Campbell and Marlon Devonish) that won the 4 × 100 m relay in 38.19, but he was disqualified with the British team in August 2003 after he admitted to using THG between 2000 and 2002.

Field
1994 | 1998 | 2002 | 2006 | 2010

Women's results

Track
1994 | 1998 | 2002 | 2006 | 2010

Field
1994 | 1998 | 2002 | 2006 | 2010

Medal table

Participating nations

 (6)
 (1)
 (1)
 (14)
 (2)
 (27)
 (18)
 (1)
 (13)
 (13)
 (2)
 (40)
 (16)
 (14)
 (49)
 (66)
 (2)
 (88)
 (1)
 (60)
 (51)
 (30)
 (3)
 (29)
 (13)
 (94)
 (16)
 (13)
 (1)
 (2)
 (5)
 (1)
 (30)
 (17)
 (55)
 (39)
 (22)
 (89)
 (1)
 (17)
 (22)
 (70)
 (45)
 (10)
 (8)
 (37)
 (9)

Notes
Differences to competition format since the 1998 European Championships

New event added:
Women's 20 km walk replaces the 10 km walk.

References 
Specific

General
 European Athletic Association

 
European Athletics Championships
A
European Athletics Championships
International athletics competitions hosted by Germany
Sports competitions in Munich
2000s in Munich
2002 in European sport
August 2002 sports events in Europe